Kyros Vassaras (born 1 February 1966) is a Greek former professional football referee. Vassaras is a polyglot, being able to speak Greek, German, English and Spanish.

Vassaras became a FIFA referee in 1998, and refereed his first senior international in 1999, in a match between Austria and San Marino. That same year, he was selected as one of the referees for the FIFA World U-17 Championships in New Zealand. He was named as a UEFA Elite Referee in 2004 and, since then, has officiated matches in the UEFA Champions League, the European Championships and the Olympic Games.

In 2009, after being left out of the list of European referees to officiate at the 2010 FIFA World Cup due to his age, he decided to completely retire from officiating.

He currently works as the Head of the Referee Committee for the Romanian Football Federation.

References

1966 births
Living people
Sportspeople from Thessaloniki
Greek football referees
UEFA Champions League referees
2002 FIFA World Cup referees
FIFA World Cup referees
UEFA Euro 2008 referees